The following is the complete list of the filmography of American actor Peter Jason.

Film

Television

Video games

External links
 

Male actor filmographies
American filmographies